The Dayak (older spelling: Dajak) or Dyak or Dayuh are one of the native groups of Borneo. It is a loose term for over 200 riverine and hill-dwelling ethnic groups, located principally in the central and southern interior of Borneo, each with its own dialect, customs, laws, territory, and culture, although common distinguishing traits are readily identifiable. Dayak languages are categorised as part of the Austronesian languages. The Dayak were animist (Kaharingan and Folk Hindus) in belief; however, since the 19th century there has been mass conversion to Christianity as well as Islam due to the spreading of Abrahamic religions.

Etymology
It is commonly assumed that the name originates from the Bruneian and Melanau word for “interior people”, without any reference to an exact ethnic group. The term was adopted by Dutch and German authors as an umbrella term for any non-Muslim natives of Borneo. Thus, historically, the difference between Dayaks and non-Dayaks natives could be understood as a religious distinction. English writers disapproved the classification made by the Dutch and Germans, with James Brooke preferring to use the term Dayak for only two distinct groups, the Land (Bidayuh) and Sea Dayaks (Iban).

The Dutch classification from the 19th century has since continued in Indonesia as a catch-all term for indigenous, often non-Muslim tribes on the island until today. The term gained traction in the early 1900s among rising middle class and intellectual figures (such as Hausman Baboe) from those tribes and being used as a unifying term for Dayaks in Kalimantan. In Malaysia, the term Dayak generally reserves as an almost exclusively reference to the Iban (previously referred as Sea Dayaks) and Bidayuh (known as Land Dayak in the past).

Ethnicity and languages
Dayaks do not speak just one language. Their indigenous languages belong to different subgroups of the Malayo-Polynesian languages, such as Land Dayak, Malayic, Sabahan, and Barito languages. Nowadays most Dayaks are bilingual, in addition to their native language, are well-versed in Indonesian and Malay, depending on their country of origin. Many of Borneo's languages are endemic (which means they are spoken nowhere else). This cultural and linguistic diversity parallels the high biodiversity and related traditional knowledge of Borneo. 

It is estimated that around 170 languages and dialects are spoken on the island and some by just a few hundred people, thus posing a serious risk to the future of those languages and related heritage.

In 1954, Tjilik Riwut classified the various Dayak groups into 18 tribes throughout the island of Borneo, with 403 sub-tribes according to their respective native languages, customs, and cultures. However, he did not specify the name of the sub-tribes in his publication:

Religion

Hinduism
Some of the earliest kingdoms and states in Borneo established by the Dayaks were known to practice Hinduism, including Wijayapura, Kutai, and Bangkule Sultanate. Archeologists and historians have been arguing about whether Dayaks established the oldest kingdom known to date in the Indonesian archipelago, Nan Sarunai Kingdom. The existence of this kingdom was based on several carved tomb stones and Dayak folk song Usak Jawa which is thought to refer to Majapahit conquest of Nan Sarunai in 13th to 14th centuries. It was suspected by archeologists from radiocarbon dating to exist since as early as 200BC, several centuries earlier than verified oldest kingdom in the archipelago, Kutai Kingdom. This is however disputed by historians, citing another result which yield date in 8th century and that Candi Agung, one of the archeological sites where Nan Sarunai's age were derived, was not built by Nan Sarunai according to Hikayat Banjar and was instead built by the polity established by the invader, (Negara Dipa) in 14th century. If the radiocarbon results are correct, the ownership of the older site of which Candi Agung was built over by Nan Sarunai is also debatable as they did not leave written records.

Kaharingan

In Indonesia, the Dayak indigenous religion has been given the name Kaharingan, and may be said to be a form of animism. In 1945, during the Japanese occupation, the Japanese referred to Kaharingan as the religion of the Dayak people. During the New Order in the Suharto regime in 1980, the Kaharingan is registered as a form of Hinduism in Indonesia, as the Indonesian state only recognises 6 forms of religion i.e. Islam, Protestantism, Roman Catholicism, Hinduism, Buddhism, and Confucianism respectively. The integration of Kaharingan with Hinduism is not due to the similarities in the theological system, but due to the fact that Kaharingan is the oldest belief in Kalimantan. Unlike the development in Indonesian Kalimantan, Kaharingan is not used as a religious designation in Malaysian and Brunei, thus the traditional Dayak belief system is categorized as a form of folk animism or paganism outside of the Indonesian border.

The practice of Kaharingan differs from group to group, but shamans, specialists in ecstatic flight to other spheres, are central to Dayak religion and serve to bring together the various realms of Heaven (Upper-world) and earth, and even Under-world, for example healing the sick by retrieving their souls which are journeying on their way to the Upper-world land of the dead, accompanying and protecting the soul of a dead person on the way to their proper place in the Upper-world, presiding over annual renewal and agricultural regeneration festivals, etc. Death rituals are most elaborate when a noble (kamang) dies. Due to institutionalization of Kaharingan beliefs in Indonesia, Kaharingan practices in Kalimantan has been recently codified and remolded into a more organized religion, such as with codification of Panaturan as scripture of Kaharingan in 1971, creation of official Kaharingan body Hindu Kaharingan Religion Council (Majelis Agama Hindu Kaharingan) in 1980, and standarization of its house of worship buildings called Balai Basarah .

Christianity
Over the last two centuries, many Dayaks have converted to Christianity, making them the majority of Christians in Borneo, abandoning certain cultural rites and traditional practices in the process. Christianity was introduced by European missionaries in Borneo by Rheinische Missionsgesellschaft (later followed up by the Basler Mission). Religious differences between Muslim and Christian natives of Borneo has led, at various times, to communal tensions. Relations, however between all religious groups are generally good.

Islam
Traditionally, in many parts of Borneo, embracing Muslim faith is equated with Malayisation, i.e. assimilation into the broader Malay ethnicity. There are, however, several Dayak sub-ethnicities (mainly in Central Kalimantan) which predominantly adhere to Islam, but nevertheless self-identify as Dayaks. These include e.g. the Bakumpai people, who converted to Islam in the 19th century, but still have strong linguistic and cultural ties to the Ngaju people. They have adopted a positive attitude towards the label "Dayak" and self-identify as Muslim Dayaks.

Society and customs

Economic activities

Historically, most of the Dayak people are swidden cultivators who supplement their incomes by seeking forest products, both for subsistence (ferns, medicinal plants, fibers, and timber) and for sale; by fishing and hunting and by periodic wage labor. Presently, many modern-day Dayaks are also actively engaged in many contemporary economic activities, especially in the urban areas of Borneo.

Toplessness
In the Indonesian archipelago, toplessness was the norm among the Dayak people, Javanese, and the Balinese people of Indonesia before the introduction of Islam and contact with Western cultures. In Javanese and Balinese societies, women worked or rested comfortably topless. Among the Dayak, only big breasted women or married women with sagging breasts cover their breasts because they interfered with their work. Once shirts are available, toplessness has been abandoned.

Longhouses

In the traditional Dayak society, the long house is regarded as the heart of the community, it functioned as the village, as well as the societal architectural expression. These large building, sometimes exceeds 200 meters long, may have divided into independent household apartments. The building is also equipped with communal areas for cooking, ceremonies, socializing and blacksmithing.

The superstructure is not solely revolves on architecture and design. It is a part of the Dayak traditional political entity and administrative system. Thus, culturally the people residing in the longhouse are governed by the customs and traditions of the longhouse.

Metal-working
Metal-working is elaborately developed in making  (machetes –  in Malay and Indonesian). The blade is made of softer iron, to prevent breakage, with a narrow strip of a harder iron wedged into a slot in the cutting edge for sharpness in a process called  (iron-smithing).

In headhunting, it was necessary to be able to draw the  quickly. It is holstered with the cutting edge facing upwards and at that side, there is an upward protrusion on the handle, so it can be drawn very quickly with the side of the hand without having to reach over and grasp the handle first. The hand can then grasp the handle while it is being drawn. The combination of these three factors (short, cutting edge up and protrusion) makes for an extremely fast drawing-action.

Headhunting and peacemaking

In the past, the Dayaks were feared for their ancient tradition of headhunting practices (the ritual is also known as Ngayau by the Dayaks).

Among the most prominent legacy during the colonial rule in the Dutch Borneo (present-day Kalimantan) is the Tumbang Anoi Agreement held in 1874 in Damang Batu, Central Kalimantan (the seat of the Kahayan Dayaks). It is a formal meeting that gathered all the Dayak tribes in Kalimantan for a peace resolution. In the meeting that is reputed taken several months, the Dayak people throughout the Kalimantan agreed to end the headhunting tradition as it believed the tradition caused conflict and tension between various Dayak groups. The meeting ended with a peace resolution by the Dayak people.

Subsequently, the headhunting began to surface again in the mid-1940s, when the Allied powers encouraged the practice against the Japanese occupation of Borneo. It also slightly surged in the late 1960s when the Indonesian government encouraged Dayaks to purge the Chinese from interior Kalimantan who were suspected of supporting communism in mainland China and also in the late 1990s when the Dayak started to attack Madurese emigrants in an explosion of ethnic violence.

Military
The Dayak soldiers or trackers are regarded as equivalent in bravery to the Royal Scots or the Gurkha soldiers. The Sarawak Rangers was absorbed into the British Army as the Far East Land Forces which could be deployed anywhere in the world but upon the formation of Malaysia in 1963, it formed the basis of the present day Royal Ranger Regiment.

While in Indonesia, Tjilik Riwut was remembered as he led the first airborne operation by Indonesian National Armed Forces on 17 October 1947. The team was known as MN 1001, with 17 October celebrated annually as the anniversary date for the Indonesian Air Force Paskhas, which traces its origins to that pioneer paratroop operation in Borneo.

Gallery

See also
 List of Dayak people
 Bornean traditional tattooing
 View of the tiger

References

Further reading

External links

 Tribal peoples are fighting huge hydro-electric projects that are carving up the island's rainforest
 The J. Arthur and Edna Mouw papers at the Hoover Institution Archives focuses on the interaction of Christian missionaries with Dayak people in Borneo.
 The Airmen and the Headhunters Documentary produced by the PBS Series Secrets of the Dead

 
Ethnic groups in Indonesia
Ethnic groups in Sarawak
Kalimantan
Headhunting
Indigenous peoples of Southeast Asia